TZL or tzl may refer to:

 TZL, the ASX symbol for TZ Limited, an American software company
 TZL, the IATA code for Tuzla International Airport, Bosnia and Herzegovina
 tzl, the ISO 639-3 code for Talossan language, Talossa